Xingcheng station may refer to:

 Xingcheng railway station on the Shenyang–Shanhaiguan Railway in Xingcheng, Liaoning
 Xingcheng station (Beijing Subway) on the Yanfang Line of the Beijing Subway